Kizawa (written: 木沢, 木澤 or 鬼沢) is a Japanese surname. Notable people with the surname include:

, Japanese footballer
, Japanese astronomer
, Japanese daimyō

Japanese-language surnames